Eupatorieae is a tribe of over 2000 species of plants in the family Asteraceae. Most of the species are native to tropical, subtropical, and warm temperate areas of the Americas, but some are found elsewhere. Well-known members are Stevia rebaudiana (used as a sugar substitute), a number of medicinal plants (Eupatorium), and a variety of late summer to autumn blooming garden flowers, including Ageratum (flossflower), Conoclinium (mistflower), and Liatris (blazing star or gayfeather).

Plants in this tribe have only disc florets (no ray florets) and petals which are white, slightly yellowish off-white, pink, or purple (never a full yellow).

Within the aster family, the Eupatorieae are in the subfamily Asteroideae. 
Within Asteroideae, they are in the supertribe Helianthodae. 
Within Helianthodae, they belong to an informal group without taxonomic rank called the phytomelanin cypsela clade, which contains 11 tribes.

The sister tribe of Eupatorieae is probably Perityleae. This result received moderate statistical support (68% bootstrap percentage) in a study published in 2002.

Genera

The largest genera and the approximate number of species in each are:
Mikania (440), Ageratina (290), Stevia (200), Chromolaena (165), Koanophyllon (120), Brickellia (100), and Fleischmannia (95).

Eupatorieae genera recognized by the Global Compositae Database as April 2022:

Acanthostyles 
Acritopappus 
Adenocritonia 
Adenostemma 
Ageratella 
Ageratina 
Ageratum 
Agrianthus 
Alomia 
Alomiella 
Amboroa 
Amolinia 
Antillia 
Aristeguietia 
Arrojadocharis 
Asanthus 
Ascidiogyne 
Asplundianthus 
Austrobrickellia 
Austrocritonia 
Austroeupatorium 
Ayapana 
Ayapanopsis 
Badilloa 
Bahianthus 
Barroetea 
Barrosoa 
Bartlettina 
Bejaranoa 
Bishopiella 
Bishovia 
Blakeanthus 
Brickellia 
Brickelliastrum 
Campovassouria 
Campuloclinium 
Carminatia 
Carphephorus 
Carphochaete 
Castenedia 
Catolesia 
Cavalcantia 
Centenaria 
Chacoa 
Chromolaena 
Ciceronia 
Condylidium 
Condylopodium 
Conocliniopsis 
Conoclinium 
Corethamnium 
Critonia 
Critoniadelphus 
Critoniella 
Cronquistia 
Cronquistianthus 
Crossothamnus 
Dasycondylus 
Decachaeta 
Diacranthera 
Dissothrix 
Disynaphia 
Dyscritogyne 
Eitenia 
Ellenbergia 
Erythradenia 
Eupatoriastrum 
Eupatorina 
Eupatoriopsis 
Eupatorium 
Eutrochium 
Ferreyrella 
Fleischmannia 
Fleischmanniopsis 
Flyriella 
Garberia 
Gardnerina 
Gongrostylus 
Goyazianthus 
Grazielia 
Grisebachianthus 
Grosvenoria 
Guayania 
Guevaria 
Gymnocondylus 
Gymnocoronis 
Gyptidium 
Gyptis 
Hartwrightia 
Hatschbachiella 
Hebeclinium 
Helogyne 
Heterocondylus 
Hofmeisteria 
Hughesia 
Idiothamnus 
Iltisia 
Imeria 
Isocarpha 
Jaliscoa 
Jaramilloa 
Kaunia 
Koanophyllon 
Kyrsteniopsis 
Lapidia 
Lasiolaena 
Lepidesmia 
Leptoclinium 
Leto 
Liatris 
Litothamnus 
Litrisa 
Lomatozona 
Lorentzianthus 
Lourteigia 
Macropodina 
Macvaughiella 
Malmeanthus 
Malperia 
Matudina 
Metastevia 
Mexianthus 
Microspermum 
Mikania 
Monogereion 
Morithamnus 
Neocabreria 
Neocuatrecasia 
Neohintonia 
Neomirandea 
Nesomia 
Nothobaccharis 
Oaxacania 
Ophryosporus 
Osmiopsis 
Oxylobus 
Pachythamnus 
Parapiqueria 
Peteravenia 
Phalacraea 
Phanerostylis 
Phania 
Piptothrix 
Piqueria 
Piqueriella 
Piqueriopsis 
Planaltoa 
Platypodanthera 
Pleurocoronis 
Polyanthina 
Praxeliopsis 
Praxelis 
Prolobus 
Pseudobrickellia 
Radlkoferotoma 
Raulinoreitzia 
Revealia 
Santosia 
Sartorina 
Scherya 
Sciadocephala 
Sclerolepis 
Semiria 
Shinnersia 
Siapaea 
Spaniopappus 
Sphaereupatorium 
Standleyanthus 
Stevia 
Steviopsis 
Steyermarkina 
Stomatanthes 
Stylotrichium 
Symphyopappus 
Tamaulipa 
Teixeiranthus 
Trichocoronis 
Trichogonia 
Trichogoniopsis 
Trilisa 
Tuberostylis 
Uleophytum 
Urbananthus 
Urolepis 
Vittetia 
Zyzyura

Classification

In 1987, Robert M. King and Harold E. Robinson wrote a book on Eupatorieae. In this book, they divided the tribe into 18 subtribes. These are Hofmeisteriinae, Oxylobinae, Oaxacaniinae, Mikaniinae, Trichocoroninae, Adenostemmatinae, Fleischmanniinae, Ageratinae, Eupatoriinae, Liatrinae, Praxelinae, Gyptidinae, Disynaphiinae, Ayapaninae, Alomiinae, Critoniinae, Hebecliniinae, and Neomirandeinae.

In 1994, Kare Bremer did a cladistic analysis of Eupatorieae in his book on the family Asteraceae. He recognized only 16 subtribes, subsuming Neomirandeinae into Hebecliniinae.

In 2007, D. J. Nicholas Hind and Harold E. Robinson covered Eupatorieae for The Families and Genera of Vascular Plants. They recognized 17 subtribes equivalent to those of King and Robinson (1987) except that Oaxacaniinae was placed in the synonymy of Hofmeisteriinae.

The division of this tribe into subtribes is provisional and likely to change when more data, especially DNA sequence data, becomes available.

No DNA study has yet included a large number of species and sampled widely in Eupatorieae, but 3 studies have investigated Eupatorium and its relatives within the tribe. These 3 studies are the basis for the phylogeny shown below.

In some of the older works, the genus Eupatorium has been circumscribed to include as many as 1200 species, over a third of the species in the tribe. In more recent works, Eupatorium has been defined to contain about 40–45 species, with the main differences between authors being whether to include Eutrochium and whether certain populations should be considered species, varieties, or hybrids.

As more becomes known about the Eupatorieae, other genera will surely have to be revised as well.

A partial phylogeny of the tribe (focusing on Eupatorium and some of the other North American genera) is:

From the positions of Stevia and Stomatanthes in the phylogeny, some of the subtribes are probably polyphyletic. Many of the branches in the tree above have only weak statistical support, so this tree can not serve as a basis for re-classification. For convenience, the genera will remain in their current subtribes until a much larger data set enables the production of a more robustly supported phylogeny.

Subtribes

In terms of the number of genera, the largest subtribes are Critoniinae (40), Gyptidinae (29), Ageratinae (26), Alomiinae (23), Ayapaninae (13), and Oxylobinae (9).

Gyptidinae, found mostly in eastern Brazil, is known to be polyphyletic. Hind and Robinson divide it into 3 groups based on Gyptis, Agrianthus, and Litothamnus.

Includes: Gyptis, Trichogonia, Campuloclinium, Conoclinium, 
Agrianthus, Lasiolaena, and Litothamnus.

Critoniinae.
Includes: Critonia, Fleischmanniopsis, Ophryosporus, and Neocabreria.

References

External links
 
 
 Eupatorieae In: Ed Schilling's Website

 USDA Plants  U.S. Department of Agriculture Plants Database

 
Asteraceae tribes